Karine Vallières (born 19 March 1978) is a member of the National Assembly of Quebec for the riding of Richmond, first elected in the 2012 election.

She is the daughter of Yvon Vallières, who previously served as MNA for Richmond.

References

External links
 

Living people
Quebec Liberal Party MNAs
Women MNAs in Quebec
1978 births
21st-century Canadian politicians
21st-century Canadian women politicians